Somerville is a city in Burleson County, Texas, United States. The population was 1,312 at the 2020 census. Somerville is named for Albert Somerville the first president of the Gulf, Colorado and Santa Fe Railway.

Geography

Somerville is located near the southern border of Burleson County at  (30.344616, –96.530335). The city is bordered to the west by Somerville Lake, a reservoir on Yegua Creek, part of the Brazos River basin.

Texas State Highway 36 passes through the city, leading northwest  to Caldwell, the county seat, and southeast  to Brenham.

Demographics

As of the 2020 United States census, there were 1,312 people, 438 households, and 284 families residing in the city.

As of the census of 2000, there were 1,704 people, 639 households, and 430 families residing in the city. The population density was 571.1 people per square mile (220.8/km). There were 768 housing units at an average density of 257.4 per square mile (99.5/km). The racial makeup of the city was 54.17% White, 30.52% African American, 1.06% Native American, 0.12% Asian, 11.80% from other races, and 2.35% from two or more races. Hispanic or Latino of any race were 21.48% of the population.

There were 639 households, out of which 31.6% had children under the age of 18 living with them, 43.8% were married couples living together, 18.6% had a female householder with no husband present, and 32.6% were non-families. 28.6% of all households were made up of individuals, and 14.6% had someone living alone who was 65 years of age or older. The average household size was 2.67 and the average family size was 3.32.

In the city, the population was spread out, with 30.9% under the age of 18, 9.2% from 18 to 24, 24.9% from 25 to 44, 20.0% from 45 to 64, and 15.0% who were 65 years of age or older. The median age was 34 years. For every 100 females, there were 94.1 males. For every 100 females age 18 and over, there were 87.3 males.

The median income for a household in the city was $26,208, and the median income for a family was $34,844. Males had a median income of $25,679 versus $17,379 for females. The per capita income for the city was $12,995. About 18.3% of families and 24.0% of the population were below the poverty line, including 34.5% of those under age 18 and 15.8% of those age 65 or over.

Education
Somerville is served by the Somerville Independent School District.

References

External links

 City of Somerville official website

Cities in Burleson County, Texas
Cities in Texas
Bryan–College Station